Ermesinde (July 1186 – 12 February 1247) ruled as the countess of Luxembourg from 1197 until her death. She was the only child of Count Henry IV and his second wife Agnes of Guelders.

Succession
Prior to her birth, Ermesinde's aging father, Count Henry IV of Luxembourg, had recognized his nephew Count Baldwin V of Hainaut as his heir presumptive. However, the 74-year-old count reunited with his estranged wife, Agnes of Guelders, and fathered a daughter, Ermesinde, who displaced Baldwin as heir presumptive. Upon Henry's death in 1196, a war of succession took place. At its end, it was decided that Henry's fiefs would be split: Baldwin would have Namur, Ermesinde would have Durbuy and La Roche, and Luxembourg would revert to their common liege, Emperor Henry VI, who then gave it to his brother Otto.

Rule
Ermesinde was initially betrothed to Count Henry II of Champagne, but the engagement was cancelled in 1189. Instead her first husband was Count Theobald I of Bar. He successfully negotiated with Count Philip I of Namur and his brother Count Baldwin IX of Flanders for renunciation of Luxembourg, thus making Theobald and Ermesinde the count and countess of Luxembourg. 

When Theobald died in 1214, Ermesinde married Count Waleran III of Limburg (1180–1226), with whom she then ruled Luxembourg. In 1223 Ermesinde and Waleran pressed their claim to Namur against Philip II, but were ultimately unsuccessful. After Waleran's death, Ermesinde ruled Luxembourg alone for two decades. She proved to be an effective administrator, granting charters of freedom to several towns and increasing the prosperity of her country.

Grave

According to legend, Ermesinde saw the Virgin Mary, and planned the construction on that spot of the Clairefontaine Abbey. In her will she asked that she be buried at this location. The abbey was built by her son, Henry V. After many years, the abbey was destroyed in the late 18th century by French troops. In 1747, shortly before the old abbey was destroyed by French troops, the nuns had hidden Ermesinde's remains in a chapel, where they were found by the Jesuits during 1875-1877 reconstructions. The remains are now in the crypt of the chapel of Clairefontaine.

Children 
The children of Ermesinde and her first husband, Theobald I of Bar, were: 
 Renaud (died before 1214), Seigneur of Briey
 Elisabeth (died 1262), married Valéran of Limburg, Lord of Monschau
 Margaret (d?), first married Hugh III, Count of Vaudémont (died 1243); later married Henry of Bois, regent of Vaudémont.

The children of Ermesinde and Waleran III, Count of Limburg were: 
 Henry V of Luxembourg (1216–1281), Count of Luxembourg
 Gérard I of Durbuy, Count of Durbuy (died 1276)
 Catherine of Limburg (died 1255), wife of Matthias II, Duke of Lorraine

References

External links 

 Ermesinde de Luxembourg's French Wikipedia page
 
 Namur Family Genealogy

House of Namur
Countesses of Luxembourg
12th-century women rulers
1186 births
1247 deaths
Duchesses of Limburg
13th-century women rulers
12th-century French people
12th-century French women
13th-century French people
13th-century French women